A number of hip hop artists in the United States are followers of Islam. Although any form of music is forbidden (haram) in the religion, these artists do not consider themselves as practicing Muslims.

1980s
For prominent Islamic hip hop artists like Big Daddy Kane and Rakim, the teachings of the Five Percent Nation were extremely influential. Founded in Harlem in the 1960s, the Five-Percent Nation was created by Clarence13X, a former member of the Nation of Islam (NOI) who changed his name to Allah.  The group represents individuals comprising the five percent of the population aware of the truth and committed to enlightening the public. The movement recognizes Blacks as the original inhabitants of the Earth and emphasized the importance of obtaining knowledge of self. Adherents emphasize this constantly, referring to their fellow Black men as Gods and Black women as Earths — hence establishing the culture's other name as the Nation of Gods and Earths (NGE). Despite drawing heavily from Islam, the Five-Percent Nation is not classified as a religion. This is evident in its idea that God, rather than being separate from man as is traditionally thought in Islam, is a human, specifically a Black man. Instead, the Five-Percent Nation is considered a way of life. Tenets are outlined in the Supreme Mathematics and the Supreme Alphabet, a set of principles established by Allah, the Father. These guides state that Five Percenters can interpret numbers and letters as cultural messages from Allah. Five Percenter teachings lent many frequently used expressions to hip hop and hip hop culture like "dropping science", "What up God," and "word is bond".

Rakim

Rakim was one of the earliest hip hop artists to incorporate references to Islam into their work. Born William Griffin, he later became a Five Percenter, adopting the name Rakim Allah.

In his song "My Melody," with Eric B., Rakim references the Supreme Mathematics and the Supreme Alphabet.

"I drop science like a scientist/My melodies in code"

In this verse, he references how Gods and Earths will often refer to themselves as scientists in their quest for knowledge and proof. He then describes how Five Percenters view numbers and letters as code for cultural messages from Allah.

The song "R.A.K.I.M." contains a direct reference to the Islamic god with the line "Allah who I praise to the fullest"

Big Daddy Kane

Big Daddy Kane is also a Five Percenter, having been introduced to the movement in high school. In his song "Just Rhymin' with Biz," he states that the "Kane" in his name stands for King Asiatic, Nobody's Equal, an allusion to the Five Percent Nation's teaching that the Original Man was an Asiatic Black man. His other works are also rife with references to Islam and other Five Percent Nation teachings. For example, the final verse of Big Daddy Kane's 1988 hit "Ain't No Half-Steppin'" explicitly conveys his connection to Islam.

"Hold up the peace sign, as salaam alaikum!"

This Arabic phrase, meaning "peace be upon you", is commonly used among Muslims as a salutation.

Later, his 1989 song "Mortal Combat," referenced the Supreme Mathematics. Also, in his song 1989 song "Young, Gifted, and Black" Big Daddy Kane samples a Louis Farrakhan speech.

"Beginning to end, from Knowledge to Born"

According to the Supreme Mathematics, Knowledge corresponds to the number one, and Born is represented by the number nine. This then indicates that Big Daddy Kane was repeating the beginning phrase, "beginning to end", using Five Percenter terminology.

Lakim Shabazz
Lakim Shabazz was an MC during the 1980s who derived his name from the Tribe of Shabazz. Lakim Shabazz was influenced by Islam, specifically the teachings of the Five Percent Nation. His raps also reflect this, perhaps most obviously in the song "Black is Back." The song encourages African-Americans to recognize their greatness and fight for freedom, justice and equality, as is emphasized in the following lyrics:

"You say it's gonna be hard, but I'm God, I got the proof and truth, and now it's time to get loose."

Shabazz is stating that his words are the truth, as described by the teachings of the Five Percent Nation.

Afrika Islam
Afrika Islam was a prominent hip hop producer during the 1980s. He trained extensively under Afrika Bambaataa, known as the Godfather of Hip Hop, for numerous years before embarking on his individual career. Like his mentor, Afrika Islam worked heavily with the Zulu Nation, an organization originally developed to use hip hop to stop violence and spread peace. As time passed, the Zulu Nation drew increasingly heavily from the Nation of Islam's teachings, sharing the organization's principles with its members.

The 1990s
In the early 1990s much of hip hop music became politically charged, afrocentric, and militant in nature. Nation of Islam leader Louis Farrakhan was praised by artists like Public Enemy while albums by Wu-Tang Clan and Busta Rhymes referenced Five Percent Nation. References to Islam in Hip-Hop music became explicit in the 1990s, and they were almost always characterized by a pairing with a quest for political and social justice.

Hip-Hop Minister Conrad Tillard
Nation of Islam Minister Conrad Tillard became known as the "Hip-Hop Minister," as he both criticized hip hop lyrics, and defused potentially violent feuds between rappers.  He appears in the documentary Hip-Hop: Beyond Beats and Rhymes. In the 1990s and early 2000s, Tillard was an outspoken critic of hip hop lyrics that he perceived as degrading and dangerous to Blacks. He said such lyrics suggested "that we are penny-chasing, Champagne-drinking, gold-teeth-wearing, modern-day Sambos, pimps and players." He believed that in seeking to emulate the lyrics in gangsta rap, young Black Americans became victims of mass incarceration, violence, sexual exploitation, and drug crime.

In the 1990s, he started an organization called A Movement for C.H.H.A.N.G.E. ("Conscious Hip Hop Activism Necessary for Global Empowerment"), to advocate for "conscious hip hop activism", voter registration and education, community organizing, and social empowerment for black youth.
  He criticized hip-hop lyrics that portrayed American black communities as degenerate. He also criticized the businessmen who supported that approach. He feuded with Def Jam founder Russell Simmons in 2001, accusing him of stoking violence by allowing the frequent use of words such as "nigga" and "bitch" in rap lyrics.

Tillard became a fixture in hip-hop after he arranged a meeting and a truce in a feud between rising bands Wreckx-N-Effect and A Tribe Called Quest.  Tillard also counseled Sean "Diddy" Combs during his feud with rival Suge Knight, and criticized him for what he saw as his mistreatment of Shyne Barrow.

After the drive-by shooting murder of rapper Tupac Shakur in 1996, Tillard organized a "Day of Atonement" event to advocate against violent themes in hip-hop music, to promote unity, and to celebrate Shakur's life. He invited rap group A Tribe Called Quest, Chuck D with Public Enemy, Kool Herc, Afrika Bambaataa, model Bethann Hardison, actor Malik Yoba, Bad Boy Records president Sean Combs, and rapper The Notorious B.I.G. There were an estimated 2,000 attendees. 

Tillard also criticized the Reverend Al Sharpton and other civil rights leaders, calling them "hired guns" for not condemning rappers Sean Combs or Shyne Barrows. Tillard organized another summit in Harlem at the Adam Clayton Powell Jr. State Office Building on 125th Street over what he perceived as negative imagery in hip hop. Def Jam Recordings founder Russell Simmons organized a counter-summit, urging the public not to "support open and aggressive critics of the hip-hop community".

Ice Cube
Ice Cube was born in Los Angeles where he started a group called C.I.A with a friend and eventually started collaborating with Dr. Dre, with whom he later joined Eazy-E's Compton-based group called Niggaz With Attitude (N.W.A), for which his most noteworthy role was lyricist, starting with his writing the song "Straight Outta Compton" in 1988.

He later started his solo debut as AmeriKKKa's Most Wanted where he started to tackle social issues like poverty, racism, and drug addiction, along with general critiques to American society. He started acting in 1991 and has appeared in many films since then.

In the early 1990s, Ice Cube converted to Islam, and when asked about his faith he stated, "I mean, what I call myself is a natural Muslim, because it's just me and God." On his 1991 album Death Certificate, Ice Cube samples excerpts of a speech made by Khalid Muhammad.

Mos Def
Dante Smith was born in Brooklyn, and formed a group with his siblings called Urban Thermo Dynamics and then ventured on his own, becoming part of a hip hop collective with the Jungle Brothers and A Tribe Called Quest called "Native Tongues". Later he began to work alongside Talib Kweli as Blackstar, and his music took a sociopolitical turn.

Sociopolitical hip hop gained a lot of attention in the late 1990s, and in 1999 Mos Def came out with his solo debut album Black on Both Sides. The first words spoken on this album, "Bismillah ar-Rahman ar-Raheem" translate to "In the name of God, the most gracious, the most merciful."

His father who was a member of Nation of Islam, and he became a part of the community of Imam Warithdeen Muhammad, son of Elijah Muhammad, the founder of Nation of Islam. "I got my first exposure to Islam when I was 13," he said. "My dad taught me how to make wudhu [the ritual ablution Muslims perform before prayer]."

At 19 he took the Muslim declaration of faith, the shahada and Islam became the cornerstone of his life.

Q-Tip

Jonathan Davis was born in Harlem in 1970, and in 1994, he converted to Islam and changed his name to Kamaal Ibn John Fareed. Before converting he had been agnostic.

He grew up in Queens where he went to school with Ali Shaheed Muhammad, Phife Dawg, and Jarobi White with whom he formed the group A Tribe Called Quest, and their debut album People's Instinctive Travels and the Paths of Rhythm was released in 1990. Kamaal released his debut solo album in 1999.

Ali Shaheed Muhammad
Ali Shaheed Muhammad started his career along with Q-Tip in A Tribe Called Quest, later expanding into becoming a DJ and producer and later started his solo career in 2004 with his debut LP Shaheedulah and Stereotypes.

"With regards to Islam, it definitely — I mean, I walk a different walk than probably a lot of different people in the industry. I'm not saying it like I'm better. I'm in no way any better or a saint, but there's — people can depend on me. They have. They do. And they call me the voice of reason. And I suppose that my faith has something to do with that."

"It can rip an artist apart, because then you're under the ridicule of, "Aren't you Muslim? Don't you believe in this? What you're doing goes against" — and it's just like, "Yeah, I already know everything you're saying to me." I don't know if anyone else gets that sort of scrutiny so I do understand why people keep it to themselves."

The 2000s
Freeway converted to Islam when he was 14 years old. He says, "[Islam], it's my core, it's my soul, it's my everything. He recognizes the conflicting values within the Muslim community, especially those whom believe that making music is haram. Nevertheless, he concedes that this is how he chooses to express himself and acknowledges the various paths of Muslim identity.

Beanie Sigel converted to Islam early in his life and came to the faith through his knowledge of the Five Percent Nation. He often references and alludes to his faith within his lyrics, but recognizes conflicting values within their communities.

Akon grew up in Senegal and was raised as a Muslim.

French Montana is from Morocco and is Muslim.

The Jacka was Muslim, and rapped about his faith.

Sheck Wes is from Senegal and is Muslim. His hit song "Mo Bamba" was inspired by a Tijani Saint.

Lil Durk converted once released from jail, and explains it in "Street Prayer" and "Viral Moment."

References

Islam in the United States
American hip hop
Islamic music